Fleetwood Area High School (FAHS) is a public high school in Fleetwood, Pennsylvania. It is part of the Fleetwood Area School District.

References

External links 
 

Schools in Berks County, Pennsylvania
Public high schools in Pennsylvania